Parainfluenza hemagglutinin-neuraminidase is a type of hemagglutinin-neuraminidase produced by parainfluenza.

References

Viral structural proteins